CSM Satu Mare may refer to:

CSM Satu Mare (basketball), a Romanian women's basketball club
CSM Satu Mare (football), a Romanian men's football club
CSM Satu Mare (handball), a Romanian men's handball club
, a Romanian women's volleyball club